The Iron Door Sessions  is a compilation live album by English rock band The Searchers. It contains acetate recordings of them performing at Iron Door Club in 1963, few months before their breakthrough in the UK. The Searchers re-recorded some of these tracks in the studio later and issued on their albums or singles (incl. hit versions of Sweets for My Sweet or "Ain't That Just Like Me"). Traditional Maggie May is the same song made famous by The Beatles.

Overview
The Iron Door club (situated at 13 Temple Street, Liverpool) played the same role in the Searchers’ career as the Cavern Club did for The Beatles.  It was a small music club in Liverpool managed by Les Ackerley, manager of the Searchers at the time, and it was the venue where their UK popularity started. Around January or February 1963, the Searchers taped here eleven songs from their current stage repertoire (without audience). The tape was then converted into a small number of acetates. Guitarist John McNally: "I can't remember how many copies of the acetate were made, although Les Ackerley obviously had a few to send to the record companies in London. I don't remember ever having one myself – it didn't seem important at the time." Tony Hatch, who worked as a producer and A&R man for Pye Records, was impressed enough to invite the band down to London for a test in Pye's recording studios on Marble Arch. There The Searchers recorded Sweets for My Sweet, which became their first single and the first No. 1 hit.

Rerelease
It was believed, that these Iron Door acetate records were lost, but it turns out that the only surviving copy was in the private collection of Tony Jackson, singer and bass guitarist of the band. These were released on Castle Records (Sanctuary Records) CD in 2002.

Track listing

Personnel
The Searchers
 Mike Pender – lead guitar, lead vocals, backing vocals
 John McNally – rhythm guitar, lead and backing vocals
 Tony Jackson – bass guitar, lead and backing vocals
 Chris Curtis – drums, lead and backing vocals

References

1963 live albums
The Searchers (band) albums